L.A. Story is a 1991 American satirical romantic comedy film written by and starring Steve Martin and directed by Mick Jackson. The plot follows a weatherman (Martin) trying to find love in Los Angeles. It was released on February 8, 1991, and received generally positive reviews from critics.

Plot
Harris K. Telemacher is a TV weatherman living in Los Angeles. He is in a dead-end relationship with his social-climbing girlfriend Trudi, and feels his job requires him to be undignified and unintellectual, though he has a PhD in arts and humanities. He wants to find some meaning and magic in his life, having grown increasingly weary of what he sees as the rather shallow and superficial city of LA, from overly pretentious coffee orders to bizarre shooting etiquette rules on the freeway. He spends his time roller-skating through art galleries with his friend Ariel, offering eccentric art reviews to acquaintances, remixing Shakespeare a lot, and otherwise seeking to escape his ordinary life.

At a luncheon with a group of friends, he meets Sara, a journalist from London, with whom he immediately becomes infatuated.

Driving home that night, his car breaks down on the freeway. He notices that a freeway traffic condition sign seems to be displaying messages intended solely for him. It offers him cryptic advice on his love life throughout the movie.

He begins to fall for Sara, but she is conflicted because she has pledged to reconcile with her ex-husband, Roland. Feeling that a relationship with Sara is unlikely, Harris begins dating SanDeE*, a ditzy aspiring spokesmodel, whom he meets at a clothing store. After his first date with her, Harris discovers that Trudi has been cheating on him for three years with his agent. The discovery leads him to pursue his romantic interest in Sara. This is complicated by his new relationship with SanDeE* and by Sara's feeling of obligation to Roland.

By the conclusion, he has successfully wooed Sara – with some encouragement and advice from the sign, some helpful weather, and plenty of cameos from Patrick Stewart, Chevy Chase, Iman, Rick Moranis, Terry Jones, and many others, with musical encouragement from Enya.

Cast

 Steve Martin as Harris K. Telemacher
 Victoria Tennant as Sara McDowel
 Richard E. Grant as Roland Mackey
 Marilu Henner as Trudi
 Sarah Jessica Parker as SanDeE*
 Susan Forristal as Ariel
 Kevin Pollak as Frank Swan
 Sam McMurray as Morris Frost
 Patrick Stewart as Maitre d' at L'Idiot
 Iman as Cynthia

There are uncredited cameo appearances by Chevy Chase, Woody Harrelson, Paula Abdul, Martin Lawrence, Rick Moranis (this would be the fourth and final film in which Moranis appeared with Martin), and Terry Jones. John Lithgow and Scott Bakula filmed scenes—as a movie agent and Harris's neighbor, respectively—that did not appear in the final cut (although references to Lithgow's character remain in the freeway shootout and the 'California Cuisine' lunch scenes).

Martin and Tennant were real-life husband and wife at the time of the film's production.

Release

Box office

L.A. Story was a box office success. The film earned $6.6 million during its opening weekend, and ended its theatrical run with a gross of $28 million.

Critical response
On review aggregator website Rotten Tomatoes, the film holds an approval rating of 93% based on 43 reviews, with an average rating of 7.60/10. The site's critical consensus reads, "A romantic comedy that doubles as a love letter to the titular city, L.A. Story is Steve Martin at his silly, sweetly soulful best." On Metacritic, the film has a weighted average score of 66 out of 100, based on 11 critics, indicating "generally favorable reviews". Audiences polled by CinemaScore gave the film an average grade of "B" on an A+ to F scale.

In 2008, L.A. Story was voted by a group of Los Angeles Times writers and editors as the 20th best film set in Los Angeles in the last 25years—with two criteria: "The movie had to communicate some inherent truth about the L.A. experience, and only one film per director was allowed on the list".

References

External links

 
 
 
 
 

1991 films
1990s fantasy comedy-drama films
1990s romantic comedy-drama films
American romantic comedy-drama films
American satirical films
American fantasy comedy-drama films
Films based on A Midsummer Night's Dream
Films directed by Mick Jackson
Films set in Los Angeles
Films shot in Los Angeles
Midlife crisis films
Films with screenplays by Steve Martin
Carolco Pictures films
StudioCanal films
TriStar Pictures films
1991 comedy-drama films
1990s English-language films
1990s American films